Feride Acar (born 1948) is a Turkish international expert on women and gender.
She was the founding chair of the Middle East Technical University's gender and women's studies program. Between 2003 and 2005 served as chair of the Committee on the Elimination of Discrimination against Women and served three consecutive terms as president of the Council of Europe's Group of Experts of Action against Violence against Women and Domestic Violence (GREVIO). In 2019, she was awarded the Pro Merito Medal of the Council of Europe for her service to that body in advancing women's rights.

Early life and education
Ayşe Feride Acar was born on 14 January 1948 in Bursa, Turkey. She earned a bachelor's degree in sociology at the Middle East Technical University in Ankara in 1970. She furthered her education in the United States, earning a master's degree in 1973 and a PhD in 1976, from Bryn Mawr College in political sociology.

Career

Academics
After completing her studies, Acar returned to Turkey and was hired as an Associate Professor in the Department of Public Administration at the Middle East Technical University (METU), teaching sociology. She was the founding chair of the Gender and Women's Studies Graduate Program at METU and served as its head from 1994 to 2004. Simultaneously, she served as chair of the Department of Political Science and Public Administration from 2001 to 2007. She retired in 2015.

Activism
From the 1980s, Acar was active in the women's rights movement. She attended the 1995 Beijing Conference on women and was elected to the Committee on the Elimination of Discrimination against Women (CEDAW Committee) in 1997. She served on the CEDAW Committee through 2005, acting as its rapporteur between 1999 and 2001, vice president from 2001 to 2003, and president between 2003 and 2005. She returned to the CEDAW Committee in 2011 and served until 2019. She assisted in the development of the Istanbul Convention from 2006 to 2011 and when its monitoring organ went into force, she served as a member. She was the Turkish Representative of the first monitoring Ad Hoc Committee (CAHVIO) from 2009 to 2010, and from 2015, the Group of Experts of Action against Violence against Women and Domestic Violence (GREVIO). Acar was elected for three consecutive terms as president of GREVIO, completing her service in 2019.

Awards and honors
In 2010, she was the honoree of the Parliamentarians for Global Action's Defender of Democracy Award. In 2018, she was honored for her record in human rights by the Canadian government and that same year was honored by the Turkish Association of University Women for her activism. In 2019, Acar was awarded the Pro Merito Medal of the Council of Europe for her service in advancing women's rights.

Research and selected works
The focus of Acar's research has typically been gender equality and women's rights. She has written on women in academia and education, in socio-political movements, and with regard to international human rights standards. Among her works are:

References

Citations

Bibliography

1948 births
Living people
People from Bursa
Middle East Technical University alumni
Bryn Mawr College alumni
Academic staff of Middle East Technical University
Gender studies academics
Turkish sociologists
Turkish women's rights activists
Turkish women activists
Turkish women academics
Women sociologists
20th-century Turkish women scientists
20th-century social scientists
21st-century social scientists